Daren R. Dochterman (born July 2, 1967) is an American illustrator and set-designer. He illustrated for Get Smart, Rush Hour 3, Monster House, Poseidon, Sky High, and Master and Commander: The Far Side of the World. He is otherwise credited with The Chronicles of Riddick, The Terminal, Dr. Seuss' How the Grinch Stole Christmas, The Flintstones in Viva Rock Vegas, The Nutty Professor, Sleepless in Seattle, and James Cameron's The Abyss. Dochterman has twice been a guest of honor at the science, science fiction, and fantasy convention, CONvergence.Dochterman was recognized for his work by having shared a Video Premier Award for his supervision of visual effects in the movie Star Trek: The Motion Picture. He was also a conceptual illustrator on the film G.I. Joe: The Rise of Cobra.

Early life
Daren Dochterman was born in 1967, he spent his early childhood living in the suburbs of New York City. He would then go on to spend his teenage years in the Chicago area, graduating from Fenton High School in Bensenville, Illinois. Dochterman always loved drawing, but not necessarily the structure of his earlier art classes. He also participated in other fine arts programs during his early education.

Education and early career
Darren Dochterman attended the University of Southern California, beginning his freshman year in 1985 as an undeclared major. He had applied twice to the USC School of Cinema-Television, and rejected once. He enrolled in all the Film classes he could, which led to him supporting himself financially with graphics work that he did for student films. He helped run the Post Production Department in his Sophomore year. After two years of maintaining an undeclared status at the university, and six rejection letters from the Cinema School, Dochterman chose to look for work.

Dochterman spent a year working as a model builder, prop maker, graphic artist and gofer allowing him to gain professional experience. Then, a friendship with a fellow USC student led him to working for director James Cameron to help restore full size props and models from the film Aliens. A job as the Assistant to the Art department for Cameron’s film, The Abyss, helped integrate him into the movie production industry. He even appeared in the film as a news reporter.

Darren Dochterman expanded his expertise in 1990 by deciding to develop skills working with digital art.

Art Department credits
Journey 2: The Mysterious Island (2012), concept artist/concept illustrator 
Real Steel (2011), concept artist 
Priest (2011), production illustrator
TRON: Legacy (2010), production illustrator
Iron Man 2 (2010), conceptual illustrator 
G.I. Joe: The Rise of Cobra (2009), concept illustrator 
Dragonball: Evolution (2009), concept artist
The Day the Earth Stood Still (2008), conceptual artist
Get Smart (2008), concept artist
Rush Hour 3 (2007), illustrator
Monster House (2006), conceptual artist
X-Men: The Last Stand (2006), conceptual artist
Poseidon (2006), production illustrator
Sky High (2005), production illustrator
The Terminal (2004), conceptual artist
The Chronicles of Riddick (2004), illustrator 
Master and Commander: The Far Side of the World (2003), production illustrator
Clockstoppers (2002), illustrator
Alien Hunter (2001), concept art 
How the Grinch Stole Christmas (2000), production illustrator
The Flintstones in Viva Rock Vegas (2000), production illustrator 
The Story of Us (1999), illustrator 
The Saint (1997), illustrator 
The Nutty Professor (1996), storyboard artist
Down Periscope (1996), illustrator
Se7en (1995), illustrator
Star Trek: Voyager (1995), illustrator
Junior (1994), illustrator
Earth 2 (1994), illustrator - 1 episode
World War II: When Lions Roared (1994), illustrator
Monkey Trouble (1994), storyboard artist
Freaked (1993), storyboard artist
Sleepless in Seattle (1993), illustrator 
Honey, I Blew Up the Kid (1992), illustrator
What About Bob? (1991), junior illustrator 
The Exorcist III (1990), assistant to production designer 
The Abyss (1989), assistant to art department

References

External links

 Official website DarenDoc.com

Living people
1967 births
American illustrators
Science fiction artists
American speculative fiction artists
American storyboard artists